P'tit con is a French comedy film directed by Gérard Lauzier in 1984.

Plot
Stuck at his parents' home, Michel, a teenager, is looking for ways to become a man. The society around him is corrupted, there isn't much to look forward to, the revolution has faded, and he feels that nobody loves him. Not even Salima, the young Algerian that he met on a jaunt in the Parisian night. Only his cool Hippie friend René offers him solace.

Cast
 Guy Marchand as Bob Choupon
 Caroline Cellier as Annie Choupon
 Bernard Brieux as Michel Choupon
 Souad Amidou as Salima
 Josiane Balasko as Rolande
 Gérard Darrieu as the Legionnaire
 Philippe Khorsand as Eric
 Claudine Delvaux as Maryse
 Leila Fréchet as Claudine
 Pierre Fayet as René
 Daniel Auteuil as Jeannot
 Patricia Millardet as Aurore
 Robert Dalban as the Concierge
 Tanya Lopert as the Psychiatrist

References

External links
 
 
 

1984 films
Films based on French comics
French coming-of-age films
1980s French-language films
French satirical films
Live-action films based on comics
Films scored by Vladimir Cosma
1980s coming-of-age films
1980s satirical films
Films directed by Gérard Lauzier
1980s French films